Sadik Mikhou (born 25 July 1990) is a Moroccan-born middle-distance runner who since 2015 runs internationally for Bahrain. He competed at the 2017 World Championships finishing sixth. Additionally, he won the gold at the 2017 Islamic Solidarity Games. He switched his allegiance from Morocco.

On 8 August International Testing Agency confirmed that Alsadik Mikhou has been provisionally suspended for receiving a blood transfusion during the Tokyo Olympics. This marks his second suspension, as he was suspended in 2018 for 2 years.

International competitions

1Did not finish in the final

Personal bests

Outdoors
800 metres – 1:46.55 (Rabat 2014)
1000 metres – 2:22.28 (Rabat 2011)
1500 metres – 3:31.34 (Hengelo 2017)
3000 metres – 7:39.02 (Paris 2016)
10 kilometres – 28:05 (Doha 2017)

References

1990 births
Living people
Bahraini male middle-distance runners
Moroccan male middle-distance runners
World Athletics Championships athletes for Bahrain
Athletes (track and field) at the 2018 Asian Games
Asian Games competitors for Bahrain
Moroccan emigrants to Bahrain
Islamic Solidarity Games competitors for Bahrain
Athletes (track and field) at the 2020 Summer Olympics
Olympic athletes of Bahrain
Bahraini sportspeople in doping cases
Doping cases in athletics